Scout Life, originally Boys' Life, is a magazine published by the Boy Scouts of America since 1911.  

Boys' Life, Boy's Life or Boys Life may also refer to:

 Boys Life (band), a band from Kansas City, Missouri, between 1993–1997
Boys Life (Boston band), a band from Boston, Massachusetts, between 1980 and 1982
 Boy's Life (Japanese magazine), a Japanese-language magazine published from 1963 to 1969 in Japan by Shogakukan
 Boy's Life (novel), 1991 novel by American author Robert McCammon
 Boys Life (film), 1995 compilation of three short subject films